Georgi Krasimirov Georgiev (born 25 February 1981) is a Bulgarian footballer who plays as a defender for Lokomotiv Mezdra.

References

1981 births
Living people
Bulgarian footballers
First Professional Football League (Bulgaria) players
PFC Pirin Blagoevgrad players
PFC Ludogorets Razgrad players
PFC Svetkavitsa players
FC Dunav Ruse players
OFC Pirin Blagoevgrad players
FC Oborishte players
FC Botev Vratsa players
PFC Lokomotiv Mezdra players

Association football defenders